Henry VIII is an opera in four acts by Camille Saint-Saëns, from a libretto by Léonce Détroyat and Armand Silvestre, based on El cisma en Inglaterra (The Schism in England) (1627) by Pedro Calderón de la Barca.

Composition history

The action covers the period in Henry VIII's life when the king was attempting to divorce Queen Catherine of Aragon in favour of marrying Anne Boleyn, a move rejected by the Church.

In an effort to evoke the historical context, Saint-Saëns researched English music from the period and incorporated several English, Scottish, and Irish folk melodies into his score, as well as two airs by William Byrd (c. 1540–1623), contained in The Will Forster Virginal Book (1624), the "Carman's Whistle" and a section of a tune called "The New Medley". He also sampled from the Benjamin Cosyn's Virginal Book (1620), using the opening from the tune "Mr Beauins Service", along with "Te Deum". Henry VIII died in 1547, about 70 years before these compositions were published.

Performance history
Henry VIII was premiered on 5 March 1883 by the Paris Opera at the Palais Garnier in Paris. The choreography was by Louis Mérante, the costumes were designed by Eugène Lacoste, and the settings were by Antoine Lavastre and Eugène Carpezat (act 1), Jean-Baptiste Lavastre (act 2 and act 4, scene 2), and Auguste Alfred Rubé and Philippe Chaperon (act 3, scene 2, and act 4, scene 1). The opera was revived in three acts on 19 July 1889 with the ballet organized by Joseph Hansen. A new production in the original four-act version, directed by Paul Stuart, premiered on 18 June 1909, with choreography by Léo Staats, costumes by Charles Bianchini, and sets by Carpezat, Marcel Jambon and Alexandre Bailly. Henry VIII remained in the repertoire of the Opéra until 1919.

It was also seen at the Royal Opera House, London, in 1889 with Maurice Renaud in the title role, Lina Pacary as Catherine d'Aragon, and Meyriane Héglon as Anne Boleyn. It was revived in 1991 at the Théâtre Impérial de Compiègne in a production by Pierre Jourdan, with Philippe Rouillon as Henry VIII,  as Catherine of Aragon and Lucile Vignon as Anne Boleyn. The production was made into a film.

Performances were given at the Liceu in Barcelona in 2002 where it was staged once again by Pierre Jourdan with Montserrat Caballé as Catherine, Simon Estes as Henry and Nomeda Kazlaus as Anne Boleyn, with José Collado conducting.

The United States premiere was presented by Bel Canto Opera in New York City on 27 April 1974 with Jason Byce as Henry VIII, Francesca Lawton-Sherman as Queen Catherine, Katherine Basler as Anne Boleyn under the musical direction of Susan Peters.

A concert performance was given at the Bard College Music Festival, Annandale-on-Hudson, on 20 August 2012, with Ellie Dehn as Catherine, Jason Howard as Henry, and Jennifer Holloway as Anne Boleyn. Leon Botstein conducted.

Roles

Recordings
 Philippe Rouillon (Henry), Michèle Command (Catherine), Lucile Vignon (Anne Boleyn), Alain Gabriel (Don Gómez), conducted by Alain Guingal. Le Chant du monde. 1991 (also available as a DVD, Kultur International Films)
 "Ô cruel souvenir!" (Catherine) Véronique Gens on Tragédiennes 3, Les Talens Lyriques, Christophe Rousset (2011, Virgin Classics)
 Complete recording of 1883 version, 4 CDs – Michael Chioldi (Henry), Ellie Dehn (Catherine), Hilary Ginther (Anne Boleyn), Yeghishe Manucharya (Don Gómez), Gil Rose conducting the Odyssey Opera (2022, Odyssey Opera OO1005)

References

Further reading

External links

 
 Henry VIII 1883: visual documentation of the premiere on Gallica
 Work details, Odyssey Opera
 , Véronique Gens, Les Talens Lyriques, Christophe Rousset

Operas by Camille Saint-Saëns
French-language operas
Operas
1883 operas
Cultural depictions of Henry VIII
Cultural depictions of Anne Boleyn
Opera world premieres at the Paris Opera
Operas set in the British Isles
Operas based on plays
Operas based on works by Pedro Calderón de la Barca